The Ivy League is an American collegiate athletic conference comprising eight private research universities in the Northeastern United States. The term Ivy League is typically used beyond the sports context to refer to the eight schools as a group of elite colleges with connotations of academic excellence, selectivity in admissions, and social elitism. Its members are Brown University, Columbia University, Cornell University, Dartmouth College, Harvard University, Princeton University, University of Pennsylvania, and Yale University.

While the term was in use as early as 1933, it became official only after the formation of the athletic conference in 1954. All of the "Ivies" except Cornell were founded during the colonial period; they thus account for seven of the nine colonial colleges chartered before the American Revolution. The other two colonial colleges, Rutgers University and the College of William & Mary, became public institutions.

Overview 

Ivy League schools are viewed as some of the most prestigious universities in the world. All eight universities place in the top 18 of the 2023 U.S. News & World Report National Universities ranking, including three Ivies in the top five (Yale, Harvard, and Princeton). U.S. News has named a member of the Ivy League as the best national university every year since 2001: , Princeton eleven times, Harvard twice, and the two schools tied for first five times. In the 2021 U.S. News & World Report Best Global University Ranking, two Ivies rank in the top 10 internationally (Harvard first and Columbia sixth). All eight Ivy League schools are members of the Association of American Universities, the most prestigious alliance of American research universities.

Undergraduate enrollments range from about 4,500 to about 15,000, larger than most liberal arts colleges and smaller than most state universities. Total enrollment, which includes graduate students, ranges from approximately 6,600 at Dartmouth to over 20,000 at Columbia, Cornell, Harvard, and Penn. Ivy League financial endowments range from Brown's $6.9 billion to Harvard's $53.2 billion, the largest financial endowment of any academic institution in the world.

The Ivy League is similar to other groups of universities in other countries, such as the Grandes écoles in France, Russell Group in the United Kingdom, the C9 League in China, the Imperial Universities in Japan, and the Group of Eight in Australia.

Members
Ivy League universities have some of the largest university financial endowments in the world, allowing the universities to provide abundant resources for their academic programs, financial aid, and research endeavors. As of 2021, Harvard University had an endowment of $53.2 billion, the largest of any educational institution. Each university attracts millions of dollars in annual research funding from both the federal government and private sources.

History

Year founded

Note: Six of the eight Ivy League universities consider their founding dates to be simply the date that they received their charters and thus became legal corporations with the authority to grant academic degrees. Harvard University uses the date that the legislature of the Massachusetts Bay Colony formally allocated funds for the creation of a college. Harvard was chartered in 1650, although classes had been conducted for approximately a decade by then. The University of Pennsylvania initially considered its founding date to be 1750; this is the year which appears on the first iteration of the university seal. Later in Penn's early history, the university changed its officially recognized founding date to 1749, which was used for all of the nineteenth century, including a centennial celebration in 1849. In 1899, Penn's board of trustees formally adopted a third founding date of 1740, in response to a petition from Penn's General Alumni Society. Penn was chartered in 1755, the same year collegiate classes began. "Religious affiliation" refers to financial sponsorship, formal association with, and promotion by, a religious denomination. All of the schools in the Ivy League are private and not currently associated with any religion.

Origin of the name 

"Planting the ivy" was a customary class day ceremony at many colleges in the 1800s. In 1893, an alumnus told The Harvard Crimson, "In 1850, class day was placed upon the University Calendar. ... the custom of planting the ivy, while the ivy oration was delivered, arose about this time." At Penn, graduating seniors started the custom of planting ivy at a university building each spring in 1873 and that practice was formally designated as "Ivy Day" in 1874. Ivy planting ceremonies are recorded at Yale, Simmons College, and Bryn Mawr College among other schools. Princeton's "Ivy Club" was founded in 1879.

The first usage of Ivy in reference to a group of colleges is from sportswriter Stanley Woodward (1895–1965).

The first known instance of the term Ivy League appeared in The Christian Science Monitor on February 7, 1935. Several sportswriters and other journalists used the term shortly later to refer to the older colleges, those along the northeastern seaboard of the United States, chiefly the nine institutions with origins dating from the colonial era, together with the United States Military Academy (West Point), the United States Naval Academy, and a few others. These schools were known for their long-standing traditions in intercollegiate athletics, often being the first schools to participate in such activities. At this time, however, none of these institutions made efforts to form an athletic league.

A common folk etymology attributes the name to the Roman numeral for four (IV), asserting that there was such a sports league originally with four members. The Morris Dictionary of Word and Phrase Origins helped to perpetuate this belief. The supposed "IV League" was formed over a century ago and consisted of Harvard, Yale, Princeton, and a fourth school that varies depending on who is telling the story. However, it is clear that Harvard, Princeton, Columbia, and Yale met on November 23, 1876, at the so-called Massasoit Convention to decide on uniform rules for the emerging game of American football, which rapidly spread.

Pre-Ivy League
Seven out of the eight Ivy League schools are Colonial Colleges: institutions of higher education founded prior to the American Revolution. Cornell, the exception to this commonality, was founded immediately after the American Civil War. These seven colleges served as the primary institutions of higher learning in British America's Northern and Middle Colonies. During the colonial era, the schools' faculties and founding boards were largely drawn from other Ivy League institutions. Also represented were British graduates from the University of Cambridge, the University of Oxford, the University of St. Andrews, and the University of Edinburgh.

The influence of these institutions on the founding of other colleges and universities is notable. This included the Southern public college movement which blossomed in the decades surrounding the turn of the 19th century when Georgia, South Carolina, North Carolina and Virginia established what became the flagship universities of their respective states. In 1801, a majority of the first board of trustees for what became the University of South Carolina were Princeton alumni. They appointed Jonathan Maxcy, a Brown graduate, as the university's first president. Thomas Cooper, an Oxford alumnus and University of Pennsylvania faculty member, became the second president of the South Carolina college. The founders of the University of California came from Yale, hence Berkeley's colors are Yale Blue and California Gold. Cornell served as a model for Stanford University and, in 1891, provided Stanford with its first president.

A plurality of the Ivy League schools have identifiable Protestant roots. Harvard, Yale, and Dartmouth all held early associations with the Congregationalists. Princeton was financed by New Light Presbyterians, though originally led by a Congregationalist. Brown was founded by Baptists, though the university's charter stipulated that students should enjoy "full liberty of conscience." Columbia was founded by Anglicans, who composed 10 of the college's first 15 presidents. Penn and Cornell were officially nonsectarian, though Protestants were well represented in their respective founding. In the early nineteenth century, the specific purpose of training Calvinist ministers was handed off to theological seminaries, but a denominational tone and religious traditions including compulsory chapel often lasted well into the twentieth century.

"Ivy League" is sometimes used as a way of referring to an elite class, even though institutions such as Cornell University were among the first in the United States to reject racial and gender discrimination in their admissions policies. This dates back to at least 1935. Novels and memoirs attest this sense, as a social elite; to some degree independent of the actual schools.

Racial segregation and integration 
Ivy League institutions have a long and complicated history of racial segregation, and, eventually, integration. All of the universities in the Ivy League, excluding Cornell University, were chartered during the American era of slavery. In 2003, Brown University was the first of all the Ivies to take accountability for their historic ties to slavery and the transatlantic slave trade.

Following Brown, other universities in the Ivy League created committees to examine their own ties to slavery. Their reports have since found various economic and social ties to slavery. Yale University for example, used profits from slave traders and owners to fund its first scholarships, libraries, and faculty members. To date, some of Yale's residential colleges are also named after slave traders and supporters.

Harvard, Princeton, Columbia, and the University of Pennsylvania's investigations all found that, in the century following their charters, enslaved Black people lived on campus to care for students, professors, and/or the university's presidents. Notably, Princeton's first nine presidents were slave owners, and in 1766, a slave auction reportedly took place on Princeton's campus.  

While the Ivy League has a history of slavery, a small number of Black people did attend Ivy League institutions as students during their early years, which paved the way for more students of color to attend in the future.

19th and early 20th centuries 

Ivy League universities admitted few students of color in their early years. Each university in the League had different policies regarding the admission of Black students- Dartmouth for example had their first Black graduate in 1828, while Princeton would not admit their first Black student until well into the 1900s.

Early Black admits to Ivy League universities were controversial, and faced backlash from students and administrators alike. Dartmouth's first Black graduate, Edward Mitchell, was initially denied admission out of fear of "offend[ing] students." Dartmouth students protested this decision, leading to Mitchell's admission in 1824. Harvard admitted its first Black student, Beverly Garnett Williams, in 1847. News of this incited protests by Harvard students and faculty. Unfortunately, Williams died before the academic year had begun and was never able to attend the prestigious university. It would not be not until 1870 when Richard Theodore Greener became the first African American to receive a degree from Harvard.

Although there were no official policies that could prohibit the Ivy League from admitting students of color, most Ivies would accept greater numbers of Black students in the later decades of the 19th century. Due to the lack of official policy, it was left to university administrations to determine their own rates of integration. Princeton University, often referred to as the "Southernmost Ivy", was the last to integrate from the eight, and was responsible for revoking a Black student's admittance when his race was revealed in the 1930s.

At the time of its charter, Cornell seemed to be the most progressive of the Ivy League institutions, with an inclusive admissions policy accepting students "regardless of race or gender." Cornell University also had the highest Black student population compared to other Ivy League universities at that time. Despite this, however, Black students still faced legal and social segregation in the town of Ithaca, New York. In 1905, Black students reported being denied housing while attending Cornell.

Similarly, between the years 1890 and 1940, an average of three Black men enrolled at Harvard per year.  In 1923, Harvard's Board of Overseers overruled University President, Abbot Lawrence's ban on Black students living in dorms, announcing that all freshmen would be permitted to live in the dorms, regardless of race. This, however, did not end segregation at Harvard. The Board of Overseers upheld that although Black students were able to live in the dorms, “men of the white and colored races shall not be compelled to live and eat together."

Early on, the few Black students admitted to Ivy League universities were mostly from wealthy Caribbean families. Barriers preventing African American students from attending Ivy League universities included their location in the Northeast, the cost of tuition, and the lack of quality secondary education opportunities in a racially segregated country. As a result, there was a fairly small number of Black students attending and graduating from the eight Ivy League institutions. In fact, more Black students were attending the elite Ivy League graduate and professional schools compared to their undergraduate programs.

By the middle of the 20th century, only 54 Black men and women had graduated with a Bachelor degree from Ivy League universities. All eight Ivy League institutions remained exclusive at this point.

Late 20th century 

The middle of the 1900s marked a turning point for racial integration on Ivy League campuses, with many schools responding to World War II era programs and pushes from the ongoing civil rights movement.

After the introduction of the V-12 Navy College Training Program in 1942, all eight Ivy institutions saw increased numbers of Black student enrollment. For Princeton University, which had one of the more conservative policies regarding Black student admission, this program marked the first time Black students were able to receive bachelor's degrees from Princeton. While a small number of Black students were recorded taking courses at Princeton as early as 1774, none received degrees until the introduction of the V-12 Program.

With no universal goal for integration by the institutions as a collective, each school experienced increased racial diversity at different rates, with Dartmouth having 120 Black undergraduates in the class of 1945 and Princeton having a cumulative total of less than 100 Black undergraduates by 1967.

Despite the 1954 Supreme Court decision in Brown v. Board of Education, private universities like those making up the Ivy League were not legally required to abide by the ruling. It wasn't until the 1976 decision in Runyon v. McCrary that private institutions became legally prohibited from discriminating on the basis of race. But, by the early 1960s, admissions offices across the Ivy League began to make concentrated efforts to increase the number of Black applicants to their universities, rolling out initiatives that actively sought Black talent from high schools. Efforts for racial integration at Ivy League institutions relied on the support of student organizations and faculty-led initiatives to seek prospective Black students, such as the work of the Citizenship Council at Columbia University, which sought to show Black students that they would be welcome on campus. These efforts also prompted internal University action, such as the creation of Cornell's Committee on Special Educational Projects (COSEP), an organization aimed to recruit and support Black students. By 1965, however, Black students would still only make up 2% of admitted students across all the Ivies.

Prior to the 1960s, the majority of Ivy League universities explicitly prohibited the admission of women, instead forming partnerships with nearby women's colleges. As such, Black women were not able to attend Ivy League universities until they changed their policies to accept women. Lillian Lincoln Lambert was the first Black woman to receive a degree from an Ivy League university after graduating with a master's degree from Harvard Business School in 1969. Lincoln Lambert was also a founding member of Harvard's African American Student Union, which according to her, actively recruited Black students and created "a space where Black students could find not only support but resources for everything from barber shops that cut Black hair to churches."

As Black student populations began to increase at Ivy League schools, on-campus activism saw an increase in the wake of the ongoing civil rights movement. Black students at each Ivy League institution took their own avenues to making change. In 1969, students in Cornell's Afro-American Society led an armed occupation of Willard Straight Hall to protest the university's racist policies and “its slow progress in establishing a Black studies program.” In the same year, students associated with Yale's New Left organization, Students for a Democratic Society worked closely with the New Haven Black Panthers to lead sit-ins and protests that advocated for the admission of more students of color and the establishment of an African American studies department.

At Brown University, identity based student organizations such as the United African People and the African American Society called for an increase to the number of Black faculty and increased attention to the needs of Black students. Likewise, demonstrations at Harvard and Columbia took the form of occupations and non-violent sit-ins that were often subject to forceful removal by local police, whom administrators would call. Activism at Dartmouth took a different shape during this time period, as students would use demonstrations that were happening at other Ivies, and colleges around the country, to effectively position their demands for progress within the prospect of taking actions similar to those happening elsewhere.

21st century 

Similar to the late 20th century, the number of Black students on Ivy League campuses also increased in the 21st century. From 2006 to 2018, there was an approximated 50% increase in the admission of Black students into the entering class, growing from 1,110 to 1,663. As of 2018, the universities comprising the Ivy League unanimously support Harvard University's “race-conscious admissions” model. This form of affirmative action was described by Harvard University representatives as one of the factors increasing campus diversity.

In recent years, there have been counters to this admissions model, as others have interpreted the Fourteenth Amendment, the basis on which Harvard's “race-conscious admissions” model is set, as forbidding the consideration of race in higher education admissions. Institutions in favor of Harvard's model argue that in addition to academic excellence they also aim to form a diverse student body, while individuals that argue against the model state that it is discriminatory against certain applicants.

The addition of more Black students to Ivy League universities in the early 2000s was also accompanied by an increase in the number of Black faculty at these institutions. However, the increase in Black faculty has not been as strong as the increase in Black students. In 2005, 588– or about 3.9%– of the Ivy's 14,831 full time faculty members were Black. This proportion decreased to 3.4% in 2015. Notably, in 2001, Ruth J. Simmons became the president of Brown University, making her the first and only African American to lead an Ivy League institution.

The 21st century saw the continuation of demonstrations by Ivy League students revolving around race. Many of these demonstrations have sought to continue the work of their 20th century predecessors by advocating for increased admission and support of Black students. In light of the Students for Fair Admissions v. President and Fellows of Harvard College Supreme Court case, students from Yale and Harvard joined other universities in protesting in defense of race-conscious admissions policies.

Likewise, Black students from Ivy League institutions continue to protest for the betterment of Black students' lives on campus and beyond. Following Michael Brown's death in 2014, students across the Ivies formed the Black Ivy Coalition, which included members from all eight institutions and aimed to combat anti-Black racism.  Individual Ivy League universities also formed their own advocacy organizations and movements as a direct response to instances of anti-Black violence. After the murder of Michael Brown, Princeton University students formed the Black Justice League, which in 2015, occupied Nassau Hall and presented a list of demands to university administrators. Similarly, in 2017, Cornell students made demands to their administration protesting the assault of a Black student. Led by Black Students United, the demands included banning the Psi Upsilon fraternity for hate crimes, implementing implicit bias training, and introducing policies to increase the number of Black students at the university.

Student demonstrations have also focused on sparking change beyond Ivy League campuses. Following the Black Lives Matter protests in 2020, Harvard's Black Law Students Association, beyond calling for more Black faculty, critical race theory curriculum, and protection for student protestors, also called on the university to divest from prisons and denounce state-sanctioned violence.

In response to racially charged incidents across the country and prompting from student activists, Ivy League universities have removed and renamed campus landmarks. In response to the 2016 Black Lives Matter protests, Cornell renamed their botanical gardens, previously called the "Cornell Plantations," to the "Cornell Botanical Gardens." Similarly, in response to the murder of George Floyd in 2020, Princeton University removed Woodrow Wilson's name from a residential college and the School of Public and International Affairs because of his “racist thinking and policies.”

History of the athletic league

19th and early 20th centuries

The first formal athletic league involving eventual Ivy League schools (or any US colleges, for that matter) was created in 1870 with the formation of the Rowing Association of American Colleges. The RAAC hosted a de facto national championship in rowing during the period 1870–1894.

In 1881, Penn, Harvard College, Haverford College, Princeton College (then known as College of New Jersey), and Columbia College formed The Intercollegiate Cricket Association, which Cornell University later joined. Penn won The Intercollegiate Cricket Association championship (the de facto national championship) 23 times (18 solo, 3 shared with Haverford and Harvard, 1 shared with Haverford and Cornell, and 1 shared with just Haverford) during the 44 years that The Intercollegiate Cricket Association existed (1881 through 1924).
 In 1895, Cornell, Columbia, and Penn founded the Intercollegiate Rowing Association, which remains the oldest collegiate athletic organizing body in the US. To this day, the IRA Championship Regatta determines the national champion in rowing and all of the Ivies are regularly invited to compete.A basketball league was later created in 1902, when Columbia, Cornell, Harvard, Yale, and Princeton formed the Eastern Intercollegiate Basketball League; they were later joined by Penn and Dartmouth.

In 1906, the organization that eventually became the National Collegiate Athletic Association was formed, primarily to formalize rules for the emerging sport of football. But of the 39 original member colleges in the NCAA, only two of them (Dartmouth and Penn) later became Ivies.

In February 1903, intercollegiate wrestling began when Yale accepted a challenge from Columbia, published in the Yale News. The dual meet took place prior to a basketball game hosted by Columbia and resulted in a tie. Two years later, Penn and Princeton also added wrestling teams, leading to the formation of the student-run Intercollegiate Wrestling Association, now the Eastern Intercollegiate Wrestling Association (EIWA), the first and oldest collegiate wrestling league in the US.

In 1930, Columbia, Cornell, Dartmouth, Penn, Princeton and Yale formed the Eastern Intercollegiate Baseball League; they were later joined by Harvard, Brown, Army and Navy.

Before the formal establishment of the Ivy League, there was an "unwritten and unspoken agreement among certain Eastern colleges on athletic relations". The earliest reference to the "Ivy colleges" came in 1933, when Stanley Woodward of the New York Herald Tribune used it to refer to the eight current members plus Army. In 1935, the Associated Press reported on an example of collaboration between the schools:

Despite such collaboration, the universities did not seem to consider the formation of the league as imminent. Romeyn Berry, Cornell's manager of athletics, reported the situation in January 1936 as follows:

Within a year of this statement and having held month-long discussions about the proposal, on December 3, 1936, the idea of "the formation of an Ivy League" gained enough traction among the undergraduate bodies of the universities that the Columbia Daily Spectator, The Cornell Daily Sun, The Dartmouth, The Harvard Crimson, The Daily Pennsylvanian, The Daily Princetonian and the Yale Daily News would simultaneously run an editorial entitled "Now Is the Time", encouraging the seven universities to form the league in an effort to preserve the ideals of athletics. Part of the editorial read as follows:

The Ivies have been competing in sports as long as intercollegiate sports have existed in the United States. Rowing teams from Harvard and Yale met in the first sporting event held between students of two U.S. colleges on Lake Winnipesaukee, New Hampshire, on August 3, 1852. Harvard's team, "The Oneida", won the race and was presented with trophy black walnut oars from then-presidential nominee General Franklin Pierce. The proposal did not succeed—on January 11, 1937, the athletic authorities at the schools rejected the "possibility of a heptagonal league in football such as these institutions maintain in basketball, baseball and track." However, they noted that the league "has such promising possibilities that it may not be dismissed and must be the subject of further consideration."

Breaking the color barrier 
The integration of sports followed a similar pattern to the overall integration of the Ivy League's in the 19th and early 20th century. There was no active policy that would discriminate against incorporating Black student athletes into the athletic coalition. Harvard has the earliest record of breaking the color barrier in athletics after recruiting William Henry Lewis to their football team in 1892. Dartmouth followed suit, with Black athletes integrating onto their football teams in 1904. Brown integrated their football team shortly after, in 1916. Cornell would follow suit in 1937. University of Penn had Black students on their track and field team as early as 1908. Columbia's track and field team would be integrated in 1934. Basketball would become integrated at Yale in 1926, at Princeton in 1947.

Post-World War II
In 1945 the presidents of the eight schools signed the first Ivy Group Agreement, which set academic, financial, and athletic standards for the football teams. The principles established reiterated those put forward in the Harvard-Yale-Princeton presidents' Agreement of 1916. The Ivy Group Agreement established the core tenet that an applicant's ability to play on a team would not influence admissions decisions:

In 1954, the presidents extended the Ivy Group Agreement to all intercollegiate sports, effective with the 1955–56 basketball season. This is generally reckoned as the formal formation of the Ivy League. As part of the transition, Brown, the only Ivy that had not joined the EIBL, did so for the 1954–55 season. A year later, the Ivy League absorbed the EIBL. The Ivy League claims the EIBL's history as its own. Through the EIBL, it is the oldest basketball conference in Division I.

As late as the 1960s many of the Ivy League universities' undergraduate programs remained open only to men, with Cornell the only one to have been coeducational from its founding (1865) and Columbia being the last (1983) to become coeducational. Before they became coeducational, many of the Ivy schools maintained extensive social ties with nearby Seven Sisters women's colleges, including weekend visits, dances and parties inviting Ivy and Seven Sisters students to mingle. This was the case not only at Barnard College and Radcliffe College, which are adjacent to Columbia and Harvard, but at more distant institutions as well. The movie Animal House includes a satiric version of the formerly common visits by Dartmouth men to Massachusetts to meet Smith and Mount Holyoke women, a drive of more than two hours. As noted by Irene Harwarth, Mindi Maline, and Elizabeth DeBra, "The 'Seven Sisters' was the name given to Barnard, Smith, Mount Holyoke, Vassar, Bryn Mawr, Wellesley, and Radcliffe, because of their parallel to the Ivy League men's colleges."

In 1982 the Ivy League considered adding two members, with Army, Navy, and Northwestern as the most likely candidates; if it had done so, the league could probably have avoided being moved into the recently created Division I-AA (now Division I FCS) for football. In 1983, following the admission of women to Columbia College, Columbia University and Barnard College entered into an athletic consortium agreement by which students from both schools compete together on Columbia University women's athletic teams, which replaced the women's teams previously sponsored by Barnard.When Army and Navy departed the Eastern Intercollegiate Baseball League in 1992, nearly all intercollegiate competition involving the eight schools became united under the Ivy League banner. The two major exceptions are wrestling, with the Ivies that sponsor wrestling—all except Dartmouth and Yale—members of the EIWA and hockey, with the Ivies that sponsor hockey—all except Penn and Columbia—members of ECAC Hockey.

COVID-19 pandemic
The Ivy League was the first athletic conference to respond to the COVID-19 pandemic by shutting down all athletic competition in March 2020, leaving many Spring schedules unfinished. The Fall 2020 schedule was canceled in July, and winter sports were canceled before Thanksgiving. Of the 357 men's basketball teams in Division I, only ten did not play; the Ivy League made up eight of those ten. By giving up its automatic qualifying bid to March Madness, the Ivy League forfeited at least $280,000 in NCAA basketball funds. As a consequence of the pandemic, an unprecedented number of student athletes in the Ivy League either transferred to other schools, or temporarily unenrolled in hopes of maintaining their eligibility to play post-pandemic. Some Ivy alumni expressed displeasure with the League's position. In February 2021 it was reported that Yale declined a multi-million dollar offer from alum Joseph Tsai to create a sequestered "bubble" for the lacrosse team. The league announced in a May 2021 joint statement that "regular athletic competition" would resume "across all sports" in fall 2021.

Commitment to activism 
Following the Black Lives Matter protests in 2020, the Ivy League Conference committed itself to uphold "diversity, equity, and inclusion," to combat racism and homophobia. At Brown, Columbia, Cornell, Dartmouth, Harvard, and Princeton there are Black Student Athlete groups and other affinity groups that are dedicated to ensuring their organizations are committed to anti-racism and anti-homophobia.

Academics

Admissions

The Ivy League schools are highly selective, with all schools reporting acceptance rates at or below approximately 10% at all of the universities. For the class of 2025, six of the eight schools reported acceptance rates below 6%. Admitted students come from around the world, although those from the Northeastern United States make up a significant proportion of students.

In 2021, all eight Ivy League schools recorded record high numbers of applications and record low acceptance rates. Year over year increases in the number of applicants ranged from a 14.5% increase at Princeton to a 51% increase at Columbia.

There have been arguments that Ivy League schools discriminate against Asian-American candidates. For example, in August 2020, the US Justice Department argued that Yale University discriminated against Asian-American candidates on the basis of their race, a charge the university denied. Harvard was subject to a similar challenge in 2019 from an Asian American student group, with regard to which a federal judge found Harvard to be in compliance with constitutional requirements. The student group has since appealed that decision, and the appeal is still pending as of August 2020.

Prestige

Members of the League have been highly ranked by various university rankings. All of the Ivy League schools are consistently ranked within the top 20 national universities by the U.S. News & World Report Best Colleges Ranking. The Wall Street Journal rankings place all eight of the universities within the top 15 in the country.

Further, Ivy League members have produced many Nobel laureates and winners of the Nobel Memorial Prize in Economic Sciences.  Another measure is endowment size per student.

Collaboration
Collaboration between the member schools is illustrated by the student-led Ivy Council that meets in the fall and spring of each year, with representatives from every Ivy League school. The governing body of the Ivy League is the Council of Ivy Group presidents, composed of each university president. During meetings, the presidents discuss common procedures and initiatives for their universities.

The universities collaborate academically through the IvyPlus Exchange Scholar Program, which allows students to cross-register at one of the Ivies or another eligible school such as Berkeley, Chicago, MIT, and Stanford.

Culture

Fashion and lifestyle

Different fashion trends and styles have emerged from Ivy League campuses over time, and fashion trends such as Ivy League and preppy are styles often associated with the Ivy League and its culture.

Ivy League style is a style of men's dress, popular during the late 1950s, believed to have originated on Ivy League campuses. The clothing stores J. Press and Brooks Brothers represent perhaps the quintessential Ivy League dress manner. The Ivy League style is said to be the predecessor to the preppy style of dress.

Preppy fashion started around 1912 to the late 1940s and 1950s as the Ivy League style of dress. J. Press represents the quintessential preppy clothing brand, stemming from the collegiate traditions that shaped the preppy subculture. In the mid-twentieth century J. Press and Brooks Brothers, both being pioneers in preppy fashion, had stores on Ivy League school campuses, including Harvard, Princeton, and Yale.

Some typical preppy styles also reflect traditional upper class New England leisure activities, such as equestrian, sailing or yachting, hunting, fencing, rowing, lacrosse, tennis, golf, and rugby. Longtime New England outdoor outfitters, such as L.L. Bean, became part of conventional preppy style. This can be seen in sport stripes and colors, equestrian clothing, plaid shirts, field jackets and nautical-themed accessories. Vacationing in Palm Beach, Florida, long popular with the East Coast upper class, led to the emergence of bright colors combinations in leisure wear seen in some brands such as Lilly Pulitzer. By the 1980s, other brands such as Lacoste, Izod and Dooney & Bourke became associated with preppy style.

Though the Ivy League style is most commonly associated with the white, male elites that historically made up Ivy League campuses, the style was quickly popularized among Black communities during the civil rights era. Reinterpretations of this style by African-American men in the 1950s and 1960s combined the preppy Ivy League style with other popular Black styles of dress. This led to the emergence of a new style of dress, the Black Ivy style.

Today, Ivy League styles continue to be popular on Ivy League campuses, throughout the U.S., and abroad, and are oftentimes labeled as "Classic American style" or "Traditional American style".

Social elitism

The Ivy League is often associated with the upper class White Anglo-Saxon Protestant community of the Northeast, Old money, or more generally, the American upper middle and upper classes. Although most Ivy League students come from upper-middle and upper-class families, the student body has become increasingly more economically and ethnically diverse. The universities provide significant financial aid to help increase the enrollment of lower income and middle class students. Several reports suggest, however, that the proportion of students from less-affluent families remains low.

Phrases such as "Ivy League snobbery" are ubiquitous in nonfiction and fiction writing of the early and mid-twentieth century. A Louis Auchincloss character dreads "the aridity of snobbery which he knew infected the Ivy League colleges". A business writer, warning in 2001 against discriminatory hiring, presented a cautionary example of an attitude to avoid (the bracketed phrase is his):

The phrase Ivy League historically has been perceived as connected not only with academic excellence but also with social elitism. In 1936, sportswriter John Kieran noted that student editors at Harvard, Yale, Columbia, Princeton, Cornell, Dartmouth, and Penn were advocating the formation of an athletic association. In urging them to consider "Army and Navy and Georgetown and Fordham and Syracuse and Brown and Pitt" as candidates for membership, he exhorted:

Aspects of Ivy stereotyping were illustrated during the 1988 presidential election, when George H. W. Bush (Yale '48) derided Michael Dukakis (graduate of Harvard Law School) for having "foreign-policy views born in Harvard Yard's boutique." New York Times columnist Maureen Dowd asked "Wasn't this a case of the pot calling the kettle elite?" Bush explained, however, that, unlike Harvard, Yale's reputation was "so diffuse, there isn't a symbol, I don't think, in the Yale situation, any symbolism in it. ... Harvard boutique to me has the connotation of liberalism and elitism" and said Harvard in his remark was intended to represent "a philosophical enclave" and not a statement about class. Columnist Russell Baker opined that "Voters inclined to loathe and fear elite Ivy League schools rarely make fine distinctions between Yale and Harvard. All they know is that both are full of rich, fancy, stuck-up and possibly dangerous intellectuals who never sit down to supper in their undershirt no matter how hot the weather gets." Still, the next five consecutive presidents all attended Ivy League schools for at least part of their education—George H. W. Bush (Yale undergrad), Bill Clinton (Yale Law School), George W. Bush (Yale undergrad, Harvard Business School), Barack Obama (Columbia undergrad, Harvard Law School), and Donald Trump (Penn undergrad).

Birth of Black Greek life 
Cornell University is home to Alpha Phi Alpha, founded on December 4, 1906 as the first Greek letter fraternity for African Americans. Alpha Phi Alpha was founded by Charles Cardoza Poindexter as a place for Black students to gather to have literary discussions and social functions. With over 730 chapters world wide, Alpha Phi Alpha is the largest predominately African American fraternity. Some of the most notable alumni of Alpha Phi Alpha include Dr. Martin Luther King Jr., Frederick Douglas, Justice Thurgood Marshall, Dr. Cornel West, and Duke Ellington. Members of the Alpha Phi Alpha fraternity continue to go on as trailblazers for the mission of leadership and service to others.

Black Greek Life today 
Across Ivy League universities today, Black Greek life membership has largely been limited by the number of Black students at Ivy League schools. The University of Pennsylvania is currently home to Kappa Alpha Psi, Omega Psi Phi, and Alpha Phi Alpha, all of which are also open to black students from other Philadelphia area universities like Drexel, Villanova, La Salle and St. Joseph's. Combining the black student populations at each of these universities has allowed these Greek life organizations to increase membership and streamline organizational activities.

Similar to the University of Pennsylvania, Harvard's only University-recognized Black Greek life organizations are the fraternity Alpha Phi Alpha and the sorority Alpha Kappa Alpha. These organizations are open to the Boston area universities of MIT and Tufts.  Yale is home to Alpha Phi Alpha, Alpha Kappa Alpha, and Delta Sigma Theta, which are also open to the greater New Haven area as well. Black Greek life at Ivy League schools is present today, but relies on surrounding universities to boost membership and assist organizational operations.

U.S. presidents in the Ivy League

Of the 45 persons who have served as President of the United States, 16 have graduated from an Ivy League university. Of them, eight have degrees from Harvard, five from Yale, three from Columbia, two from Princeton and one from Penn. Twelve presidents have earned Ivy undergraduate degrees. Four of these were transfer students: Woodrow Wilson transferred from Davidson College, Barack Obama transferred from Occidental College, Donald Trump transferred from Fordham University, and John F. Kennedy transferred from Princeton to Harvard. John Adams was the first president to graduate from college, graduating from Harvard in 1755.

Student demographics

Race and ethnicity

Geographic distribution
Students of the Ivy League largely hail from the Northeast, largely from the New York City, Boston, and Philadelphia areas. As all eight Ivy League universities are within the Northeast, most graduates end up working and residing in the Northeast after graduation. An unscientific survey of Harvard seniors from the Class of 2013 found that 42% hailed from the Northeast and 55% overall were planning on working and residing in the Northeast. Boston and New York City are traditionally where many Ivy League graduates end up living.

Socioeconomics and social class

Students of the Ivy League, both graduate and undergraduate, come primarily from upper middle and upper class families. In recent years, however, the universities have looked towards increasing socioeconomic and class diversity, by providing greater financial aid packages to applicants from lower, working, and lower middle class American families.

In 2013, 46% of Harvard undergraduate students came from families in the top 3.8% of all American households (i.e., over $200,000 annual income). In 2012, the bottom 25% of the American income distribution accounted for only 3–4% of students at Brown, a figure that had remained unchanged since 1992. In 2014, 69% of incoming freshmen students at Yale College came from families with annual incomes of over $120,000, putting most Yale College students in the upper middle and/or upper class. (The median household income in the U.S. in 2013 was $52,700.)

In the 2011–2012 academic year, students qualifying for Pell Grants (federally funded scholarships on the basis of need) comprised 20% at Harvard, 18% at Cornell, 17% at Penn, 16% at Columbia, 15% at Dartmouth and Brown, 14% at Yale, and 12% at Princeton. Nationally, 35% of American university students qualify for a Pell Grant.

Graduation rates

Faculty demographics

Race and ethnicity

Competition and athletics 

Ivy champions are recognized in sixteen men's and sixteen women's sports. In some sports, Ivy teams actually compete as members of another league, the Ivy championship being decided by isolating the members' records in play against each other; for example, the six league members who participate in ice hockey do so as members of ECAC Hockey, but an Ivy champion is extrapolated each year. In one sport, rowing, the Ivies recognize team champions for each sex in both heavyweight and lightweight divisions. While the Intercollegiate Rowing Association governs all four sex- and bodyweight-based divisions of rowing, the only one that is sanctioned by the NCAA is women's heavyweight. The Ivy League was the last Division I basketball conference to institute a conference postseason tournament; the first tournaments for men and women were held at the end of the 2016–17 season. The tournaments only award the Ivy League automatic bids for the NCAA Division I Men's and Women's Basketball Tournaments; the official conference championships continue to be awarded based solely on regular-season results. Before the 2016–17 season, the automatic bids were based solely on regular-season record, with a one-game playoff (or series of one-game playoffs if more than two teams were tied) held to determine the automatic bid. The Ivy League is one of only two Division I conferences which award their official basketball championships solely on regular-season results; the other is the Southeastern Conference. Since its inception, an Ivy League school has yet to win either the men's or women's Division I NCAA basketball tournament.

On average, each Ivy school has more than 35 varsity teams. All eight are in the top 20 for number of sports offered for both men and women among Division I schools. Unlike most Division I athletic conferences, the Ivy League prohibits the granting of athletic scholarships; all scholarships awarded are need-based (financial aid). In addition, the Ivies have a rigid policy against redshirting, even for medical reasons; an athlete loses a year of eligibility for every year enrolled at an Ivy institution. Additionally, the Ivies prohibit graduate students from participating in intercollegiate athletics, even if they have remaining athletic eligibility. The only exception to the ban on graduate students was that seniors graduating in 2021 were allowed to play at their current institutions as graduate students in 2021–22. This was a one-time-only response to the Ivies shutting down most intercollegiate athletics in 2020–21 due to COVID-19. Ivy League teams' non-league games are often against the members of the Patriot League, which have similar academic standards and athletic scholarship policies (although unlike the Ivies, the Patriot League allows both redshirting and play by eligible graduate students).

In the time before recruiting for college sports became dominated by those offering athletic scholarships and lowered academic standards for athletes, the Ivy League was successful in many sports relative to other universities in the country. In particular, Princeton won 26 recognized national championships in college football (last in 1935), and Yale won 18 (last in 1927). Both of these totals are considerably higher than those of other historically strong programs such as Alabama, which has won 15, Notre Dame, which claims 11 but is credited by many sources with 13, and USC, which has won 11. Yale, whose coach Walter Camp was the "Father of American Football," held on to its place as the all-time wins leader in college football throughout the entire 20th century, but was finally passed by Michigan on November 10, 2001. Harvard, Yale, Princeton and Penn each have over a dozen former scholar-athletes enshrined in the College Football Hall of Fame. Currently Dartmouth holds the record for most Ivy League football titles, with 18, followed closely by Harvard and Penn, each with 17 titles. In addition, the Ivy League has produced Super Bowl winners Kevin Boothe (Cornell), two-time Pro Bowler Zak DeOssie (Brown), Sean Morey (Brown), All-Pro selection Matt Birk (Harvard), Calvin Hill (Yale), Derrick Harmon (Cornell) and 1999 "Mr. Irrelevant" Jim Finn (Penn).

Beginning with the 1982 football season, the Ivy League has competed in Division I-AA (renamed FCS  The Ivy League teams are eligible for the FCS tournament held to determine the national champion, and the league champion is eligible for an automatic bid (and any other team may qualify for an at-large selection) from the NCAA. However, since its inception in 1956, the Ivy League has not played any postseason games due to concerns about the extended December schedule's effects on academics. The Ivy League plays a strict 10-game schedule, compared to other FCS members' schedules of 11 (or, in some seasons, 12) regular season games, plus post-season, which expanded in 2013 to five rounds with 24 teams, with a bye week for the top eight teams. Football is the only sport in which the Ivy League declines to compete for a national title.

In addition to varsity football, Penn, Princeton and Cornell also field teams in the 9-team Collegiate Sprint Football League, in which all players must weigh 178 pounds or less. With Princeton canceling its program in 2016, Penn is the last remaining founding members of the league from its 1934 debut, and Cornell is the next-oldest, joining in 1937. Yale and Columbia previously fielded teams in the league but no longer do so.

Teams

The Ivy League is home to some of the oldest college rugby teams in the United States. Although these teams are not "varsity" sports, they compete annually in the Ivy Rugby Conference.

Men's sponsored sports by school

Men's varsity sports not sponsored by the Ivy League

Notes:

1: Though the Ivy League lists ice hockey as a sponsored sport, all six ice hockey playing Ivy League schools participate as members of ECAC Hockey.
2: Though the Ivy League lists wrestling as a sponsored sport, all six Ivy League schools with wrestling teams participate as members of the Eastern Intercollegiate Wrestling Association.

Women's sponsored sports by school

Women's varsity sports not sponsored by the Ivy League

Notes:

1: Though the Ivy League lists ice hockey as a sponsored sport, all six ice hockey playing Ivy League schools participate as members of ECAC Hockey.

Historical results

The table above includes the number of team championships won from the beginning of official Ivy League competition (1956–57 academic year) through 2016–17. Princeton and Harvard have on occasion won ten or more Ivy League titles in a year, an achievement accomplished 10 times by Harvard and 24 times by Princeton, including a conference-record 15 championships in 2010–11. Only once has one of the other six schools earned more than eight titles in a single academic year (Cornell with nine in 2005–06). In the 38 academic years beginning 1979–80, Princeton has averaged 10 championships per year, one-third of the conference total of 33 sponsored sports.

In the 12 academic years beginning 2005–06 Princeton has won championships in 31 different sports, all except wrestling and men's tennis.

Rivalries

Rivalries run deep in the Ivy League. For instance, Princeton and Penn are longstanding men's basketball rivals; "Puck Frinceton" T-shirts are worn by Quaker fans at games. In only 11 instances in the history of Ivy League basketball, and in only seven seasons since Yale's 1962 title, has neither Penn nor Princeton won at least a share of the Ivy League title in basketball, with Princeton champion or co-champion 26 times and Penn 25 times. Penn has won 21 outright, Princeton 19 outright. Princeton has been a co-champion 7 times, sharing 4 of those titles with Penn (these 4 seasons represent the only times Penn has been co-champion). Harvard won its first title of either variety in 2011, losing a dramatic play-off game to Princeton for the NCAA tournament bid, then rebounded to win outright championships in 2012, 2013, and 2014. Harvard also won the 2013 Great Alaska Shootout, defeating TCU to become the only Ivy League school to win the now-defunct tournament.

Rivalries exist between other Ivy league teams in other sports, including Cornell and Harvard in hockey, Harvard and Princeton in swimming, and Harvard and Penn in football (Penn and Harvard have won 28 Ivy League Football Championships since 1982, Penn-16; Harvard-12). During that time Penn has had 8 undefeated Ivy League Football Championships and Harvard has had 6 undefeated Ivy League Football Championships. In men's lacrosse, Cornell and Princeton are perennial rivals, and they are two of three Ivy League teams to have won the NCAA tournament. In 2009, the Big Red and Tigers met for their 70th game in the NCAA tournament. No team other than Harvard or Princeton has won the men's swimming conference title outright since 1972, although Yale, Columbia, and Cornell have shared the title with Harvard and Princeton during this time. Similarly, no program other than Princeton and Harvard has won the women's swimming championship since Brown's 1999 title. Princeton or Cornell has won every indoor and outdoor track and field championship, both men's and women's, every year since 2002–03, with one exception (Columbia women won the indoor championship in 2012). Harvard and Yale are football and crew rivals although the competition has become unbalanced; Harvard has won all but one of the last 15 football games and all but one of the last 13 crew races.

Intra-conference football rivalries

The Yale–Princeton series is the nation's second-longest by games played, exceeded only by "The Rivalry" between Lehigh and Lafayette, which began later in 1884 but included two or three games in each of 17 early seasons. For the first three decades of the Yale-Princeton rivalry, the two played their season-ending game at a neutral site, usually New York City, and with one exception (1890: Harvard), the winner of the game also won at least a share of the national championship that year, covering the period 1869 through 1903. This phenomenon of a finale contest at a neutral site for the national title created a social occasion for the society elite of the metropolitan area akin to a Super Bowl in the era prior to the establishment of the NFL in 1920. These football games were also financially profitable for the two universities, so much that they began to play baseball games in New York City as well, drawing record crowds for that sport also, largely from the same social demographic. In a period when the only professional team sports were fledgling baseball leagues, these high-profile early contests between Princeton and Yale played a role in popularizing spectator sports, demonstrating their financial potential and raising public awareness of Ivy universities at a time when few people attended college.

Extra-conference football rivalries

Championships

NCAA team championships

This list, which is current through July 1, 2015, includes NCAA championships and women's AIAW championships (one each for Yale and Dartmouth). Excluded from this list are all other national championships earned outside the scope of NCAA competition, including football titles and retroactive Helms Foundation titles.

Athletic facilities

Other ivies 
The term Ivy is sometimes used to connote a positive comparison to or an association with the Ivy League, often along academic lines. The term has been used to describe the Little Ivies, a grouping of small liberal arts colleges in the Northeastern United States. Other common uses include the Public Ivies, the Hidden Ivies, the Southern Ivies, and the Black Ivies.

Ivy Plus 
The term Ivy Plus is sometimes used to refer to the original eight institutions (in this context the Ancient Eight) plus several other schools for purposes of alumni associations, university consortia, or endowment comparisons. In his book Untangling the Ivy League, Zawel writes, "The inclusion of non–Ivy League schools under this term is commonplace for some schools and extremely rare for others. Among these other schools, Massachusetts Institute of Technology and Stanford University are almost always included. The University of Chicago and Duke University are often included as well."  The term IvyPlus also refers to a formal exchange scholar program that includes all the Ivy League schools as well as Berkeley, Chicago, MIT, and Stanford.

See also

 Big Three—an athletic rivalry between Harvard, Yale, and Princeton.
 List of Ivy League medical schools—schools of the Ivy League universities that offer medical education.
 List of Ivy League law schools—schools of the Ivy League universities that offer various law degrees.
 List of Ivy League business schools—schools of the Ivy League universities that offer various business degrees, especially the MBA.
 List of Ivy League public policy schools—schools of the Ivy League universities that offer public policy or public administration degrees.
 Seven Sisters—seven liberal arts colleges previously open to only women with historical affiliations to the Ivy League.
 Public Ivy—public colleges & universities that are perceived to provide an education equal to the Ivy League.
 Black Ivy League—informal list of private historically black colleges & universities that have historically been seen as the African American equivalent to the Ivy League
 Little Ivies—private liberal arts colleges that historically have had the same social prestige and similar large financial endowments as the Ivy league .

References
Informational notes

Citations

External links
 

 
1954 establishments in the United States
Northeastern United States
Sports in the Eastern United States
Sports organizations established in 1954